The Democratic Party (Turkish: Demokrat Parti, DP) is a conservative political party in Northern Cyprus. The leader of the party is Fikri Ataoğlu.

Overview
The Democratic Party was founded as a breakaway from the ruling right-wing National Unity Party (UBP) in 1992. The party merged in 1993 with the New Dawn Party (YDP), a party representing the interests of the Turkish settlers in Northern Cyprus, and consistently had high levels of support in the settler population until the 2003 election. Rauf Denktaş had considerable influence on the party.

At the legislative elections for the Assembly of the Republic on 20 January 2005, the party won 13.5% of the popular vote and 6 out of 50 seats. Its candidate, Mustafa Arabacıoğlu, won 13.3% of the votes in the Northern Cyprus presidential elections on 17 April 2005. At the legislative elections on 19 April 2009 the DP won 5 out of 50 seats and 10.7% of the popular vote.

In 2013, 8 members of the parliament resigned from the National Unity Party (UBP) and joined the Democratic Party. The party subsequently renamed itself Democratic Party — National Forces. At the legislative elections in 2013, the DP greatly increased its share of the votes and won 12 out of 50 seats and 23.2% of the popular vote. The party then subsequently went on to become the junior partner of the coalition government under the Republican Turkish Party (CTP). However, in 2014, four members of the parliament resigned from the party and three of them joined the National Unity Party. In July 2015, the party became the main opposition party, against the CTP-UBP coalition. It joined the government as the junior partner once again, this time with the UBP, in April 2016.

Leaders of the Democratic Party
 Hakkı Atun (30 July 1992 - 16 August 1996)
 Serdar Denktaş (16 August 1996 - 30 November 2019)
   (30 November 2019 – present)

Election results

References

External links
 Demokrat Bakış, official newspaper of the party

Political parties in Northern Cyprus
Conservative parties in Europe
Conservative parties in Asia
1992 establishments in Northern Cyprus
Political parties established in 1992
Turkish nationalism in Cyprus
Turkish nationalist organizations